Alastos pascoei is a species of beetle in the family Cerambycidae. It was described by Martins and Galileo in 1999.

References

Hesperophanini
Beetles described in 1999